Patharkandi Assembly constituency is one of the 126 state legislative assembly constituencies in Assam state in North Eastern India. It is also one of the 8 state legislative assembly constituencies included in the Karimganj Lok Sabha constituency.

Members of Legislative Assembly

Election results

2021 results

2016 result

2011 result

2006 result

See also
 Patharkandi
 List of constituencies of the Assam Legislative Assembly

References

External links 
 

Assembly constituencies of Assam
Karimganj district